Uru or URU may refer to:

Language 
 Uru dialect of Central Kilimanjaro, a Bantu language of Tanzania
 Uru language, the extinct language of the Uros, an Amerindian people
 Uru of Ch'imu, an extinct language of the Uros, an Amerindian people
 Urumi language, an extinct language of the Amazon region of Brazil
 URU (Sumerogram), a relatively distinctive sign in the cuneiform sign lists
 Urú, the addition of a preceding letter to indicate eclipsis in the Irish language; see

Places 
 Uruguay, a country in southeastern South America (ISO 3166-1 alpha-3 country code: URU)
 Üru, a village in Saare County, Estonia
 Uru, Iran, a village in Razavi Khorasan Province, Iran
 Uru, São Paulo, a city in Brazil
 Uru Uru Lake, a lake south of the Bolivian town of Oruro
 Uru Harbour Airport, an airport on Malaita, Solomon Islands
 Uru River (Goiás), a river of central Brazil
 Uru River (Maranhão), a river of northeastern Brazil
 Uyu River, or Uru River, a river of Myanmar
 Rafael Urdaneta University, a university in Venezuela
 Uru Shimbwe, town in Tanzania

People 
 Uru people, a group of pre-Incan people who live in Peru and Bolivia
 Henare Uru (1872–1929), New Zealand Maori politician
 Hopere Uru (1868–1921), New Zealand Maori politician
 Storm Uru (born 1985), New Zealand rower
 Uru (singer), a Japanese female singer.
 Black Uhuru, Reggae Musicians

Media
 Uttarakhand Residential University, a state university in Uttarakhand, India
 Uru (comics), the fictional metal in Marvel Comics, from which Thor's hammer Mjolnir is made
 Uru (The Lion King), a fictional lioness character
 Uru: Ages Beyond Myst, a 2003 computer game
 Myst Online: Uru Live, a 2007 online version of the original game
 Uru (film), a 2017 Tamil-language horror thriller film

Other
 Uru (boat), an ancient trading vessel
 Spot-winged wood quail, a bird from Latin America
 Mekanika Uru, a submachine gun
 Uruguayan Rugby Union

See also
 Uhuru (disambiguation)
 Urus (disambiguation)